3254 Bus, provisional designation , is a rare-type Hildian asteroid from the outermost region of the asteroid belt, approximately 32 kilometers in diameter. It was discovered on 17 October 1982, by American astronomer Edward Bowell at Lowell's Anderson Mesa Station in Flagstaff, Arizona. It is named after astronomer Schelte J. Bus.

Orbit and classification 

Located in the outermost part of the main-belt, Bus is a member of the Hilda family, a large orbital group of asteroids that are thought to have originated from the Kuiper belt. It orbits the Sun at a distance of 3.3–4.6 AU once every 7 years and 10 months (2,873 days). Its orbit has an eccentricity of 0.16 and an inclination of 4° with respect to the ecliptic.

Physical characteristics 

In the SMASS taxonomy, Bus is a rare T-type asteroid, while NASA's Wide-field Infrared Survey Explorer (WISE) characterizes Bus as a dark D-type asteroid.

Rotation period 

In the late 1980s or early 1990s, a rotational lightcurve of Bus was obtained from photometric observations by American astronomer Richard P. Binzel. Lightcurve analysis gave a rotation period of 6.62 hours with a brightness variation of 0.31 magnitude.

Diameter and albedo 

According to the surveys carried out by the Japanese Akari satellite and the WISE spacecraft with its subsequent NEOWISE mission, Bus measures 31.104 and 35.07 kilometers in diameter and its surface has an albedo of 0.058 and 0.073, respectively. The Collaborative Asteroid Lightcurve Link assumes a standard albedo for carbonaceous asteroids of 0.057 and calculates a diameter of 32.03 kilometers using an absolute magnitude of 11.2.

Naming 

This minor planet was named after American astronomer Schelte J. Bus, a prolific discoverer of minor planets and comets. The approved naming citation was published by the Minor Planet Center on 2 July 1985.

References

External links 
 Asteroid Lightcurve Database (LCDB), query form (info )
 Dictionary of Minor Planet Names, Google books
 Asteroids and comets rotation curves, CdR – Observatoire de Genève, Raoul Behrend
 Discovery Circumstances: Numbered Minor Planets (1)-(5000) – Minor Planet Center
 
 

 

003254
Discoveries by Edward L. G. Bowell
Named minor planets
003254
19821017